Vera Marshe (July 15, 1905 – March 25, 1984) was an American film and television character actress.

Biography 
Born in Minneapolis, Minnesota, on July 15, 1905. She began her career by appearing in a number of short films during the 30s. Her first starring role was in Nearly Naked (1933). She later focused on television during the 50s and 60s. Her final appearance was in the TV series Perry Mason (1959-1966). She's known for  Way Out West (1930), Those Endearing Young Charms (1945), The Crimson Key (1947) and Tormented (1960). Vera died on March 25, 1984, at age 78.

Filmography

References

External links

 

1905 births
1984 deaths
20th-century American actresses
American film actresses